Alpha-1,3-mannosyl-glycoprotein 4-beta-N-acetylglucosaminyltransferase A is a type II membrane protein and an enzyme – particularly a glycosyltransferase – that, in addition to the related isoenzyme B (MGAT4B), takes part in the transfer of N-acetylglucosamine (GlcNAc) to the core mannose residues of N-linked glycans in Golgi apparatus. Therefore, it is essential for the formation of tri- and tetra-antennary sugar chains. Furthermore, it is involved in glucose transport by mediating SLC2A2/GLUT2 glycosylation with controlling cell-surface expression of SLC2A2 in pancreatic beta cells  and, as it is suggested, in regulating the availability of serum glycoproteins, oncogenesis, and differentiation.

Cloning and expression 

In humans the enzyme is encoded by the MGAT4A gene. The related cDNA was first isolated by Yoshida and others. Equipped with three potential N-glycosylation sites and a length of 535 amino acids the structure of the MGAT4A gene product is similar to other known Golgi glycosyltransferases. The amino acid sequence of humans and of bovines are identical to 95%. Up to now MGAT4A was found in all human tissues and cell lines tested, whether they are normal tissues or cancer cell lines. The expression levels of MGAT4A relative to one another are similar among all tissues, but the expression levels of the correlating mRNA are quite different: Of the normal tissues, spleen, thymus, peripheral blood leukocyte, lymph node, prostate, pancreas, and small intestine showed the highest mRNA level; of the cancer cell lines the promyelocytic leukemia cell line HL-60 and the lymphoblastic leukemia cell line MOLT-4 exhibited the highest expression.

Animal studies 

It has been proposed that the MGAT4A isoenzyme acts as a toggle for developing of type 2 diabetes. Mice that lack MGAT4A are hyperglycemic and hypoinsulinemic and have impaired glucose tolerance. Moreover, MGAT4A normally protects mice from developing diabetes but is suppressed by high-fat diet. If this mechanism also operates in human islets, MGAT4A may represent a link between type 2 diabetes and high-fat diet.

References

External links